Erik Tobias Karlsson is a Swedish songwriter and record producer based in Los Angeles and Stockholm. He has worked with artists such as Halsey, Adam Lambert, Joji, Carolina Liar, James Blunt, Anouk, Linkin Park, Skillet, Kris Allen, Infinite Mass, Pauline Kamusewu and Handoffmaestro.

He founded the publishing and production company Monza Publishing together with Andreas Håkansson and Fredrik Svalstedt in 2003.

Tobias is signed to Max Martin's company MXM as a songwriter and music producer.

Selected work

References

External links 
https://www.nytimes.com/2022/11/17/theater/and-juliet-review.html
Halsey Releases "So Good," Which They Once Claimed Was Blocked by Their Label
Tobias Karlsson
Danish Charts
Tobias Karlsson music | Discogs

Year of birth missing (living people)
Living people
Swedish songwriters
Swedish record producers